London is a 1926 British silent romantic drama film, directed by Herbert Wilcox and starring Dorothy Gish. The film was adapted by Wilcox from a short story by popular author Thomas Burke. The British Film Institute considers this to be a lost film.

Background
London belongs in the canon of "Limehouse" silent films, pioneered by 1919's hugely successful Broken Blossoms which starred Gish's sister Lillian.  These films were set in what was then London's Chinatown, an area which was generally perceived as dangerous, crime-ridden, decadent and immoral; as alien, impenetrable and exotic to most Londoners as if it had been on the other side of the world.  Limehouse films, invariably featuring a young, beautiful and innocent English girl falling prey to shady, sinister characters who wished her ill, found a huge market both in the UK and overseas, and became an ongoing feature of 1920s silent cinema.

The Limehouse genre was as popular in the U.S. as in the UK, and with the awareness of the enormous revenue potential of the American market, London was tailored by Wilcox as a big-budget production with that audience in mind.  He engaged American star Dorothy Gish for the leading role, and Gish's contract earned her £1,000 per week, an exceptional amount for its time.

Plot
Mavis Hogan (Gish) lives with her uncaring aunt (Margaret Yarde) in a squalid Limehouse tenement.  Her beauty attracts the attention of an unsavoury Chinese man (Gibb McLaughlin), whose intentions are encouraged by the aunt.  While wandering around Limehouse, she is spotted by an artist (Adelqui Migliar) who is in the area sketching East End scenes and people.  He persuades her to allow him to sketch her portrait, which he later puts on display in his West End studio.  The portrait is seen by Lady Arbourfield (Daisy Campbell), who notices a remarkable resemblance to her own daughter, now deceased.

Finally finding the attentions of the Chinese man too much, Mavis leaves her home and walks to the West End with no real idea as to what she will do when she gets there.  Coincidentally, she happens to cross the path of Lady Arbourfield.  She is offered a home and the chance to make her way in "society".  Adapting remarkably well to her new milieu, Mavis falls in love with the Lady Arbourfield's nephew (John Manners), but is distraught when she is passed over in favour of another young woman (Elissa Landi) who has had him in her sights.  In her grief, she leaves her new surroundings and returns aimlessly to Limehouse.  However the artist tracks her down and asks her to marry him, which she happily accepts.

Cast

Production
Wilcox was paid £3,000 for the film plus 25% of the profits. The entire film was financed by Paramount.

Reception
On its release, London received generally good, albeit not outstanding, reviews.  The photography and acting was praised, although the storyline was deemed unconvincing and over-reliant on coincidence. The film ran in cinemas through the first half of 1927 but then disappeared from view, and no evidence can be found that it was ever distributed again after its first run.

There were no profits.

Preservation
The British Film Institute does not hold a print in the BFI National Archive, and currently classes the film as "missing, believed lost".  London is included on the BFI's "75 Most Wanted" list of missing British feature films.

See also
List of lost films

References

External links 
 BFI 75 Most Wanted entry, with extensive notes
 
 

1926 films
1926 drama films
British silent feature films
British black-and-white films
Films based on works by Thomas Burke
Films directed by Herbert Wilcox
Films set in London
Lost British films
British drama films
1926 lost films
Lost drama films
1920s British films
Silent drama films